Acianthera wyvern is a species of orchid plant native to Colombia.

References 

wyvern
Flora of Colombia
Plants described in 2001